Ben Stahl may refer to:
 Ben Stahl (activist)
 Ben Stahl (artist)